Gownjuk or Gavanjuk may refer to:
 Gownjuk-e Olya
 Gownjuk-e Sofla